The 2012 Tour of Beijing was the second running of the Tour of Beijing stage race. It started on 9, October at Tiananmen Square and ended on 13, October in Beijing's Pinggu District after five stages. It was the 28th and final race of the 2012 UCI World Tour season.

The race was won for the second successive year by German rider Tony Martin, riding for the  team. Martin won the second stage of the race with a solo attack  from the end of the stage, and ultimately won the stage by 46 seconds from his nearest competitor. He held the overall lead of the race until its conclusion, eventually winning the race by 40 seconds from  rider Francesco Gavazzi, who won the race's queen stage on the third day. 's Edvald Boasson Hagen completed the podium, 6 seconds behind Gavazzi and 46 down on Martin, and also won the points classification for the most consistent finisher on the stages over the race.

Schedule
The race again consisted of five stages; unlike the 2011 edition of the race, there was no individual time trial stage after Tony Martin maintained his race lead from his time trial win to the end of the race.

Participating teams
As the Tour of Beijing was a UCI World Tour event, all eighteen UCI ProTeams were invited automatically and obligated to send a squad. Originally, the race organisers awarded a wildcard place in the race to the  team, but they withdrew from the race following political tension between China and Japan, which resulted in Japanese riders being asked to leave September's Tour of China, that was held as part of the 2011–2012 UCI Asia Tour. They were ultimately replaced by the  team, and as such, formed the event's 19-team peloton.

The nineteen teams that competed in the race were:

Stages

Stage 1
9 October 2012 — Tiananmen Square to Bird's Nest, 

The race-opening stage was a circuit race around several of the venues that were part of the 2008 Summer Olympics, primarily between the Bird's Nest and the Water Cube. Prior to the end of the stage on the thirteenth passage through the finish line, points – along with time bonuses – were on offer at a pair of intermediate sprint points, held on the fourth and eighth passages respectively.

The quintet manage to form an advantage of around two minutes, with the main field keeping the gap in check for most of the day. The breakaway swept up the bonus seconds on offer at the sprint points, with Ladagnous gaining the most as he was first across the line at both for six bonus seconds.

Stage 2
10 October 2012 — Bird's Nest to MenTouGou, 

Following flooding in Beijing in July that caused the deaths of 79 people, race organisers were forced to re-route part of the stage, but maintained the stage start at the Bird's Nest and the finish in MenTouGou. Prior to the start of the stage, it emerged that one of the race's competitors –  rider Steve Houanard – had tested positive for the glycoprotein hormone erythropoietin (EPO), a performance-enhancing drug, in an out of competition doping test and was asked to leave the race after being suspended by the Union Cycliste Internationale.

A small group of riders bridged up to the lead group after the peloton had nearly brought them back, and they remained out front until the end. Defending race winner Tony Martin attacked this lead group with  remaining, on the climb of the Dong Gang Hong Tunnel, and sped away to win by around 45 seconds to record his first road stage win since the 2009 Tour de Suisse. His margin of victory allowed him to take the red leader's jersey, as well as the green jersey as points leader.

Stage 3
11 October 2012 — MenTouGou to Badaling Great Wall, 

The queen stage of the Tour of Beijing saw the riders negotiate four categorised climbs during the stage's  itinerary, ending in the first summit finish in the Tour's short history. Smog would also play a part in the stage's proceedings; after two previously clear days during the race, hazy conditions greeted the riders ahead of the start. Prior to the race, air quality levels were at a "severely polluted" level according to figures released by the Chinese Ministry of Environmental Protection.

With Tony Martin in the overall lead for the  team, they played a prominent part at closing down attacks in the early stages, before a seven-rider breakaway was allowed to be formed, just before the quarter-way point of the stage. The group was eventually caught with around  remaining, with several counter-attacks occurring from then on.

Sylvain Georges launched an attack to try to get clear, but  – aiding with the pace at the front of the main group – closed him down before he could establish a sizable advantage. Defending mountains classification winner Igor Antón was the next rider to try but he too was thwarted before the attack could fully materialise. Instead, 's all-rounder Edvald Boasson Hagen attacked with  remaining, and held a near 20-second lead into the final kilometre, but was closed down in the final metres, with 's Francesco Gavazzi taking his first victory for the team and his first since winning a stage of the 2011 Vuelta a España. Boasson Hagen finished third on the stage as he was also beaten to the line by  rider Dan Martin; Tony Martin held on to his race lead, with a reduced advantage of 40 seconds over Gavazzi, following the stage-winning time bonus – introduced for the 2012 edition – for Gavazzi.

Stage 4
12 October 2012 — YanQing Gui Chuan Square to Chang Ping, 

The penultimate stage of the Tour of Beijing consisted of a long loop around YanQing – making up most of the itinerary for the first half of the stage,  in length – before the riders had to negotiate three categorised climbs (within  of racing) in the Jundu Mountains, in the second half of the stage. Each of the three climbs were third-category and equally measured  in length, with average gradients for the climbs ranging from 4.2% to 5.2% respectively. From the top of the final climb – just outside Xiezishi – it was all downhill for the remaining  of the parcours into the finish in Chang Ping, with the stage finishing near to the district's gymnastics stadium.

The leaders had gained an advantage of around six-and-a-half minutes towards halfway through the stage, before  along with the sprinters' teams started to cut into the advantage. As a result, this eventually set up a bunch sprint that was won by Kritskiy's team-mate Marco Haller, a neo-pro, who achieved his first professional victory on the line.

Stage 5
13 October 2012 — Chang Ping to Ping Gu, 

Two of the day's four categorised climbs were negotiated inside the first , with the peloton having a relatively flat ride for  beyond that. Two further categorised climbs – a second-category climb to Tai Hou Village, followed by the first-category ascent of Si Zuo Lou, averaging gradients of 6.7% and 5.9% respectively – featured on the parcours before a long descent towards Ping Gu's Century Square, and the end of the race. The race remained together for the first hour of racing, with mountains classification leader Dan Martin gaining the most, claiming maximum points at each of the first two climbs.

After that, a twelve-rider move got clear of the main field but the peloton failed to let them gain a substantial advantage over them; the maximum gap that the group acquired was around two minutes. The group started to break apart on the climb to Tai Hou Village, while Martin's team-mate Ryder Hesjedal made a solo move from the main field, and soon joined up with the lead group; on the final climb, the group was reduced to a trio as only Hesjedal,  rider Jan Bakelants and 's Steve Cummings remained. Bakelants lost contact before the summit, and Hesjedal and Cummings remained clear of the field for the rest of the day. Cummings followed Hesjedal into Ping Gu, and out-sprinted him for his second victory of the season.

Classification leadership table

References

External links

2012 UCI World Tour
2012
2012 in Chinese sport
2010s in Beijing